Severnoye Izmaylovo District  is one of 16 administrative districts (raions) of Eastern Administrative Okrug, and one of the 125 raions of Moscow, Russia. It is bounded on the north by Shchyolkovo Highway, on the south by Sirenevy Boulevard, and on the east by the Moscow Ring Road (MKAD). Population: 85741 (2017 est.);

See also
Administrative divisions of Moscow

References

Notes

Sources

Districts of Moscow
Eastern Administrative Okrug